Ferdinando Ruggeri (1831 in Naples – ?) was an Italian painter, mainly painting historical and genre subjects.

Biography
Ferdinando Ruggieri first began studying natural sciences, but at the age of 22 years, he dedicated himself solely to painting. After a year of lessons under professor Domenico Caldara, in 1853, he exhibited at the contest of the Institute of Fine Arts obtaining a first prize. At the second contest, he also won the first prize for statuary. At the scuola del nudo, he also won some first prizes and gained exemption from military service. His portrait of his father won a gold medal. Awarded a first class medal, his Christopher Columbus at the Court of Spain, was once found in the Royal Palace of Naples. Among other notable works are: Silvio Pellico in the Piombi (Prison) of Venice, The last hours of Giovanni Battista Pergolese, and Vico sells his mother's ring to be able to publish his Scienza Nuova. The latter won a first prize at a Brera Academy exhibition.

He next painted Tommaso Campanella at the Court of Louis XIII of France; then the Youth of Vittorio Alfieri che si addormenta ai dolci versi di Racine, quadretto di piccola dimensione che fu scelto ad unanimità dal giurì artistico. He painted two small canvases: The infancy of Rossini; The Dream of Tortini. He also painted scenes of domestic genre, and among the subjects depicted are: A poor orphan girl; Autumn; Dispetto; Scherzo amoroso; Sospetto; Povera mamma mia non toma più!; Anche oggi verrà; Una gioia; Un forte dolore; All'ombra de'faggi; Un conto senza l'oste; Sogno e realtà; Una guardia incomotibile; Facviam la pace; Pronti per una passeggiata, cavalleria;Pane e lavoro; Il mezzo giorno alla campagna; Impressione d'un dramma; Graziella di Lamartine (inspired by Alphonse de Lamartine's novel Graziella); and Una leggitrice. He was prolific, sparsi in Francia, in Italy and in America. Also a portraitist, he spend some time in Paris where he stayed a few years si recava per esporre al Salone some of his paintings, e where dimorò due anni. For his painting of Tortini, he obtained an honorable mention. For his portrait of a young Rossini, he was honored by the Society of Friends of Fine Arts of Amiens. For this and other paintings, King Vittorio Emanuele conferred him the Cross of the knight of the Order of the Crown of Italy.

References

External links
 

1831 births
19th-century Italian painters
Italian male painters
Painters from Naples
Year of death missing
19th-century Italian male artists